Live is a live album by English new wave band Gen X, released 20 June 2005 by EMI. It was recorded on 13 December 1980 at Hatfield Polytechnic, in Hertfordshire.

Track listing

Live

Personnel 
Generation X
 Billy Idol − vocals
 Tony James − bass
 James Stevenson − guitar
 Terry Chimes − drums

References 

Generation X (band) albums
2005 live albums
EMI Records live albums